In geometry, the great dodecicosahedron (or great dodekicosahedron) is a nonconvex uniform polyhedron, indexed as U63. It has 32 faces (20 hexagons and 12 decagrams), 120 edges, and 60 vertices. Its vertex figure is a crossed quadrilateral.

It has a composite Wythoff symbol, 3  |, requiring two different Schwarz triangles to generate it: (3  ) and (3  ). (3   | represents the great dodecicosahedron with an extra 12  pentagons, and 3   | represents it with an extra 20  triangles.)

Its vertex figure 6... is also ambiguous, having two clockwise and two counterclockwise faces around each vertex.

Related polyhedra 

It shares its vertex arrangement with the truncated dodecahedron. It additionally shares its edge arrangement with the great icosicosidodecahedron (having the hexagonal faces in common) and the great ditrigonal dodecicosidodecahedron (having the decagrammic faces in common).

Gallery

See also 
 List of uniform polyhedra

References

External links 
 

Uniform polyhedra